Piggyback, piggy-back, or piggybacking may mean:

Transport 
 Piggyback (transportation), something that is riding on the back of something else

Art, entertainment, and media
Splash cymbal piggybacking, mounting a cymbal on top of an already stand-mounted cymbal
"Piggyback" (song), 2017 song by Melanie Martinez
Chapter Nine: The Piggyback, 2022 episode of Stranger Things.

Business, finance, and law
 Piggy-back (law), shareholder selling rights
 Piggybacking, a practice in which a person with bad credit uses the seasoned tradeline of credit of someone else

Electronics 
 Piggyback board, a daughterboard

Healthcare 
 Piggybacking, a second infusion set onto the same intravenous line using a Y-Set (intravenous therapy)
 "Piggy-back technique", is a technique in liver transplantation in which the recipient inferior vena cava is preserved.
 Vision Correction: The wearing of zero- or very-low-strength soft (daily disposable) contact lenses behind hard lenses if the hard lenses alone are uncomfortable or damaging to the cornea.

Science
 Piggyback plant, Tolmiea menziesii
 Piggybacking, technique used in astrophotography
 PiggyBac transposon system, a type of transposable DNA element

Security
 Piggybacking (security), when an authorized person allows (intentionally or unintentionally) others to pass through a secure door when they enter.

Telecommunications 
 Piggybacking (data transmission), a bi-directional data transmission technique in network layer, sending data along with ACK called Piggybacking
 Piggybacking (Internet access), obtaining wireless access by bringing one's own computer within the range of another subscriber's service